Anictis is an extinct species of carnivorous cat-like mammal belonging to the superfamily Aeluroidea, endemic to Europe (Quercy, France) living from the Oligocene 33.9—28.4 Ma, existing for approximately .

Anictis is shown to have an omnivorous diet or more precisely, hypercarnivorous to mesocarnivorous.

Taxonomy
Anictis was named by Kretzoi (1945). It was assigned to Aeluroidea by Hunt (1998); and to Viverridae by Flynn (1998). There is one known species, Anictis simplicidens.

References

Oligocene feliforms
Oligocene mammals of Europe
Prehistoric carnivoran genera